The Sonot Kkaazoot is the premier long-distance cross-country ski race in Fairbanks, Alaska. The race includes two events, a 50 km (31 mile) and 20 km (12.5 mile) course. Both events begin and end on the Chena River in downtown Fairbanks. Both events are freestyle, mass start and are raced simultaneously.

Origins
The race was founded in 1988 by noted Fairbanks skier Bob Baker. The name of the race is based on a Koyukon word which translates roughly as 'sliding around in early spring' and was used by Native people to describe the motion of cross-country skiers.

This race has been virtual since 2020.

Course

Both the 20 km and 50 km events begin and end on the Chena River above the Cushman Street bridge in downtown Fairbanks. The course then proceeds up the Chena River, entering Fort Wainwright army post and continuing as far as the Birch Hill Ski & Snowboard Area. At that point the 20 km race turns around and returns via the same course back to the start/finish area.

The 50 km course proceeds up the Birch Hill alpine ski hill to connect with the trails system at the Birch Hill Recreation Area. From there the course follows all of the trails in the Birch Hill system (excepting the classic-only trails) in a counter-clockwise direction. After approximately 27 km the course again returns to the top of the alpine ski hill and proceeds back to the river and to the start/finish area by the same route. 

In 2012 the 50 km race will make use of a new trail constructed to gain access to the Birch Hill Recreation Area. Rather than climbing directly up the alpine ski hill, the Sonot Connector trail climbs through the forest to the east of the ski hill, starting from the top of the rope tow and making two long switchbacks. 

Adjustments to the course are sometimes made due to weather or snow conditions. When it is not possible to hold the race on river, either due to ice conditions or cold temperatures, the race may be held entirely on the trail system at the Birch Hill Recreation Area, beginning and ending in the stadium area. In these cases the race is usually shortened to compensate for the addition of steeper terrain. In years of low snowfall when it is not possible to easily connect between the river and the alpine ski area, the race may be held entirely on the river. In this the 20 km course remains unchanged, but the 50 km course proceeds slightly further up the river before turning around at 12.5 km, returning to the start, and then doing another lap of the same course along the river.

Past winners

External links
 Sonot KKaazoot website
 Nordic Ski Club Fairbanks
 Sonot Kk'o'eelzoot, Talking Alaska blog post, March 15, 2009.
 Birch Hill Recreation Area
 Birch Hill Ski & Snowboard Area
 SportAlaska timing services

1988 establishments in Alaska
Annual events in Alaska
Cross-country skiing competitions
March events
Recurring sporting events established in 1988
Ski marathons in the United States
Sports competitions in Alaska
Tourist attractions in Fairbanks North Star Borough, Alaska